Fitzroy Island may refer to:

 Fitzroy Island (Antarctica)
 Fitzroy Island, Queensland
 Fitzroy Island National Park
 Fitzroy Islands (Tasmania)